Island Grove is an unincorporated community in Grove Township, Jasper County, Illinois, United States.

References

Unincorporated communities in Jasper County, Illinois
Unincorporated communities in Illinois